Savarna Deergha Sandhi is a 2019 Indian Kannada-language action comedy-drama written and directed by Veerendra Shetty. The title "Savarna Deergha Sandhi" is a word in Kannada grammar. The film is released in Kannada language starring Veerendra Shetty & actress Krishnaa playing the female lead in the movie. The music is composed by Mano Murthy and produced by Lushigton Thomas, Hemanth Kumar, Mano Murthy, Veerendra Shetty.

Cast
 Veerendra Shetty
 Krishnaa
 Surendra Bantwal
 Padmaja Rao
 Ravi Bhat
 Krishna Nadig
 Ravi Mandya
 Ajith Hanumakkanavar
 Niranjan Deshpande
 Madhu Bharadwaj

Plot
This gangster comedy revolves around Muddanna - an uneducated gangster, who is also a grammar freak. He and his gang commit crimes to help society, while also outsmarting the police and never getting caught. But one day Muddanna falls for a beautiful singer, Amruthavarshini. The film is loaded with ultimate fun, comedy, unexpected twists and turns and a musical drama. It has all elements that will leave its viewers in splits.

Production
The film is of rowdyism, comedy genre. The shooting has been done in Anekallu, Mudigere, Tumakuru, Devarayanadurga, Jigani and Bengaluru localities. Mano Murthy has provided the music. Shankar Mahadevan, Shreya Ghoshal and others have sung the songs. Loganathan Srinivasan of Malayalam movie ‘Ustad Hotel’ fame, has done the cinematography.

Tracklist

References

External links
 
For Savarna Deergha Sandhi in Sanskrit Grammar

2019 films
Indian action comedy films
2010s Kannada-language films
2019 action comedy films
2019 action drama films
2019 comedy-drama films